Atialdanga is a village in Cooch Behar district.

References

Villages in Cooch Behar district